University of the Pacific, McGeorge School of Law is a private, American Bar Association (ABA)-approved law school in the Oak Park neighborhood of the city of Sacramento, California. It is part of the University of the Pacific and is located on the University's Sacramento campus.

History 
The school that eventually became McGeorge began in 1921 when University of Chicago Law School graduate and Standard Oil executive Verne Adrian McGeorge began teaching law students at night in downtown Sacramento, California. After its formal establishment as a school in 1924, this Sacramento Law School, subsequently renamed in Professor McGeorge's honor as the "McGeorge School of Law," merged with the University of the Pacific in 1966 and came to be known as "Pacific McGeorge." McGeorge became an integral part of the University of the Pacific in 1991. The current dean of McGeorge School of Law is Michael Hunter Schwartz, formerly the dean of the William H. Bowen School of Law at University of Arkansas at Little Rock from 2013–2017.

Accreditation, memberships, rankings 
McGeorge has been approved by the American Bar Association (ABA) since 1969. As an ABA approved law school, McGeorge graduates are eligible to sit for the bar examination in any American jurisdiction.

Memberships 
McGeorge joined the Association of American Law Schools (AALS) in 1974. It has a chapter of the Order of the Coif, a national law school honorary society founded for the purposes of encouraging legal scholarship and advancing the ethical standards of the legal profession.

Rankings and bar exam passage rate 

In the 2023 U.S. News & World Report law school rankings, McGeorge School of Law was ranked 133.

Of the McGeorge alumni who took the California bar for the first time in July, 2022, 57% passed. It ranked fifteenth among the eighteen ABA-accredited California law schools.

Tuition costs 
McGeorge's tuition and fees for full-time students during the 2019–2020 academic year cost $56,776 per year, while tuition and fees for part-time students was $42,418-47,824 per year.

Academic programs 
McGeorge offers degree programs leading to the award of the J.D. (Juris Doctor), the LL.M. (Master of Laws), the M.P.A. (Master of Public Administration), the M.P.P. (Master of Public Policy) and the J.S.D. (Doctor of Juridical Science) degrees.

McGeorge offers both a three-year day division program and four-year evening division program.

The first year curriculum at McGeorge consists of 27 units. McGeorge law students must also complete 29 units of upper-level required curriculum. Therefore, 56 units out of the 88 units to graduate are required courses. All students take the same required courses.

Location 
The McGeorge School of Law is located on University of the Pacific's Sacramento campus at 3200 Fifth Avenue in the Oak Park area of Sacramento, the capital of California.

Journals and publications 

 The University of the Pacific Law Review (formerly titled "McGeorge Law Review" and "The Pacific Law Journal"). A student-run, scholarly journal publishing four issues annually. Two issues are published each year containing professional articles and student-authored comments or casenotes; one issue contains the Review of Selected California Legislation, or "Greensheets"; and one issue contains a symposium, focusing on a specific, significant legal topic.
 California Initiative Review. An online analysis of California ballot initiatives and related issues.
 California Water Law Journal. A forum for water law research.

Notable people

Notable alumni 
 Greg Aghazarian – California State Assemblyman, 26th District
 Mark Amodei – U.S. Congressman from Nevada
 Ronald J. Bath – USAF, Director of U.S. Air Force Strategic Planning
 Scott Baugh – former California State Assembly Republican Leader, 67th District
 Scott Boras – sports agent
 Consuelo María Callahan – Judge, United States Court of Appeals for the Ninth Circuit
 Lloyd Connelly – Judge, Sacramento County Superior Court
 Ellen Corbett – California State Senator, 10th District
 L. Whitney Clayton – Presidency of the Seventy of the Church of Jesus Christ of Latter-day Saints
 Christine Craft – attorney, radio talk show host, and former television news anchor
 John Doolittle – US Congressman 1991–2009
 Morrison C. England Jr. – Judge, United States District Court for the Eastern District of California
 Noreen Evans – California State Assemblywoman, 7th District
 Dayvid Figler – Former Las Vegas Municipal Court Judge, NPR commentator
 Edward J. Garcia – Judge, United States District Court for the Eastern District of California
 John M. Gerrard – Justice of the Nebraska Supreme Court

 Mikayil Jabbarov – Minister of Economy of the Azerbaijan Republic
 Michael A. Lilly  – Attorney General of Hawaii (1984–1985)
 Bill Lockyer – California State Treasurer and former California Attorney General
 Steve Martini – attorney and best-selling author of legal thriller novels
 Deborah Ortiz – former California State Senator, 6th District
 Johnnie B. Rawlinson – Judge, United States Court of Appeals for the Ninth Circuit
 Dana Makoto Sabraw – Judge, United States District Court for the Southern District of California
 Robert J. Sandoval – Openly Gay Judge Appointed to the California Superior Court.
 Victor Plata – Olympic athlete in triathlon
 Christian Wellisch – Former professional mixed martial arts combat athlete

Notable faculty 
 J. Clark Kelso, Federal Receiver overseeing healthcare reform in California's prison system, former Insurance Commissioner, former chief information officer of California.
 Anthony Kennedy, retired Associate Justice of the United States Supreme Court (served from 1988 to 2018), Pacific McGeorge faculty member since 1965.

Present Dean and Dean Emeriti 
 Michael Hunter Schwartz, 2017 – present
 Francis J. –"Jay" Mootz, 2012–2017
 Elizabeth Rindskopf Parker, 2002–2012, Executive Director and CEO of the State Bar of California Former CIA General Counsel
 Gerald Caplan, 1991–2002
 Gordon D. Schaber, 1957–1991
 John Swann, 1946–1957
 Lawrence Dowrety, 1937 – WWII closure
 Gilford Rowland, 1933–1937
 Russell Harris, 1930–1933
 Vern Adrian McGeorge, Founder, 1924–1930

References 

https://www.usnews.com/best-graduate-schools/top-law-schools/law-rankings

External links 
 

University of the Pacific (United States)
 
ABA-accredited law schools in California
Universities and colleges in Sacramento County, California
Education in Sacramento, California
Educational institutions established in 1924
1924 establishments in California
Private universities and colleges in California